Norton-juxta-Kempsey is a civil parish to the south of Worcester in the United Kingdom. It contains the villages of Norton and Littleworth. The parish has a population of approximately 2,500. As the parish name suggest, it adjoins Kempsey to the west.

The local primary school takes the name of the civil parish and is located in Littleworth. The east of the parish contains Worcestershire Parkway railway station.

"Juxta" is Latin for "next to, alongside".

References

Civil parishes in Worcestershire